David Choe (born April 21, 1976) is an American artist, musician, and former journalist and podcast host from Los Angeles. Choe's work appears in a wide variety of urban culture and entertainment contexts. He has illustrated and written for magazines including Hustler, Ray Gun and Vice. He has an ongoing relationship with the Asian pop culture store-cum-magazine Giant Robot. He once hung his work in a Double Rainbow ice cream shop located on Melrose Avenue. His figurative paintings, which explore themes of desire, degradation, and exaltation, are characterized by a raw, frenetic method that he has termed "dirty style."

Early life and education 
Choe was born in Los Angeles, California. His parents are Korean immigrants and born-again Christians. He spent his childhood in Koreatown, Los Angeles.  He has been spray-painting on the streets since he was in his teens. He briefly attended the California College of the Arts.

Career 

In 1996, Choe self-published a graphic novel titled Slow Jams; he claims to have made only 200 copies and given them away at Comic-Con in 1998, hoping to interest a publisher. In 1999, he submitted Slow Jams for the Xeric Grant and was awarded $5,000 to self-publish a second, expanded edition of 1,000 which came out in 1999 with a cover price of $4.

In 2008, with Harry Kim, he made an autobiographical documentary, Dirty Hands: The Art and Crimes of David Choe.

He accepted mural commissions from Hollywood madam Heidi Fleiss and from the founders of Facebook. After holding several solo shows in San Jose and San Francisco, he was offered a solo exhibit at the Santa Rosa Museum of Contemporary Art in 2005. He held his first New York solo exhibit, "Gardeners of Eden," in 2007 at Jonathan LeVine Gallery in Chelsea, and in 2008, he had his first UK solo exhibition, "Murderous Heart," in both the London and Newcastle locations of Lazarides Gallery, simultaneously.

Vice 
After being approached for his artwork by Gavin McInnes and Shane Smith, Choe was recruited to write and do artwork for Vice magazine.

For an online series called Thumbs Up! with Vice, which has three seasons, Choe and Harry Kim were filmed hitchhiking and freight hopping from Los Angeles to Miami and Tijuana to Alaska, and then hitching across China from Beijing to Shenzhen and the gambling mecca of Macau. A fourth season, in which Choe and Kim travel from San Francisco to New York, was 'released' on Snapchat and Instagram.

Recent: 2013-present 
In 2013, Choe began hosting an online lifestyle and entertainment podcast with adult film star Asa Akira entitled DVDASA. In a March 2014 podcast, Choe recounted an instance where he sexually assaulted a masseuse. He later released a statement to clarify that the story he recounted was fiction and should be viewed as an extension of his art.

He has also become recognized for his watercolors, which exhibited in his solo show at the Museo Universario del Chopo, Mexico City in 2013.

After receiving extensive therapy and treatment, he reemerged in 2017 with a new body of work and an exhibition in Los Angeles that presented heavy themes of trauma, self-reflection and hope for recovery.

Facebook stock

In 2005, internet entrepreneur Sean Parker, a longtime fan, asked him to paint graphic sexual murals in the interior of Facebook's first Silicon Valley office, and in 2007, Facebook CEO Mark Zuckerberg commissioned him to paint somewhat tamer murals for their next office. Although he thought the Facebook business model was "ridiculous and pointless," Choe chose to receive company stock in lieu of cash payment for the original Facebook murals. His shares were valued at approximately $200 million on the eve of Facebook's 2012 IPO.

Charitable works
Since 2008, Choe has dedicated many of his works to charity and has collaborated with foundations to support their local causes, including fundraising for Haiti with Yle Haiti, a foundation founded by Wyclef Jean; painting with the children of The LIDÈ Haiti Foundation; and painting with children of South Central LA at APCH.

Controversy 
In the early 2000s, Choe was reportedly arrested in Japan, where he was taking part in an art show, after an altercation with a police officer. Various sources cite the year as 2003 or 2005 and state that Choe spent two or three months in prison.

Choe commented in 2014 on his DVDASA podcast that he had engaged in "rapey behavior" with a masseuse. He defended his comment by explaining that the podcast itself is essentially a work of fiction. However, after he was commissioned to paint the Bowery Mural Wall in 2017, he was met with protest from other artists, including street artist Swoon, who issued a statement against his inclusion in the mural project. Another artist, Jasmine Wahi, co-organized a performance in front of the mural and stated "Our aim is to provoke widespread rejection of the continued normalization of rape culture by bringing visibility to the topic." Additionally, the mural was quickly defaced by graffiti artists.  Choe responded by again publicly denying any history of sexual assault or rape, and by apologizing for his original podcast comments.

Bibliography
Slow Jams, self-published, 1999
Bruised Fruit: The Art of David Choe, Drips Inc., 2002
Cursiv, Giant Robot, 2003
David Choe, Chronicle Books, 2010.

Filmography
Thumbs Up! documentary web series, VBS.TV (2007–2010)
The Last Dinosaur of the Congo with David Choe, VBS.TV (2011)
We Are the Strange (voice of the character Rain), independent animated film by M dot Strange (2007)
Dirty Hands: The Art and Crimes of David Choe, documentary film (2008)
 Vice, "50 Shades of Sasha Grey: How She Got into Porn & More" (appearance as Grey's friend) (2010)
Anthony Bourdain: Parts Unknown, "Koreatown, Los Angeles," season 1, episode 2 (2013)
DVDASA podcast web show, starring B-Trivia, David Choe and porn superstar Asa Akira (2013)
 Vice, season 2, episodes 3, 6 and 11 (2014)
 The Mandalorian, season 2, episode 1 " Chapter 9: The Marshal" as a ringside spectator (2020)

References

External links

 
 
 

American contemporary painters
American muralists
American graffiti artists
American graphic novelists
American people of Korean descent
California College of the Arts alumni
Living people
1976 births
Artists from Los Angeles
American podcasters
21st-century American painters
American artists of Korean descent
American male novelists
American male painters